Dayron Capetillo (born 11 September 1987) is a retired Cuban athlete who specialised in the sprint hurdles. He represented his country at the 2009 World Championships and 2010 World Indoor Championships reaching the semifinals on both occasions. In addition, he won a bronze medal at the 2009 Central American and Caribbean Championships.

His personal bests are 13.46 seconds in the 110 metres hurdles (+1.1 m/s, Tomblaine 2009) and 7.64 seconds in the 60 metres hurdles (Düsseldorf 2010).

International competitions

References

1987 births
Living people
Cuban male hurdlers
World Athletics Championships athletes for Cuba
21st-century Cuban people